Judith Ellen Heumann (December 18, 1947March 4, 2023) was an American disability rights activist, known as the "Mother of the Disability Rights Movement". She was recognized internationally as a leader in the disability community. Heumann was a lifelong civil rights advocate for people with disabilities. Her work with governments and non-governmental organizations (NGOs), non-profits, and various other disability interest groups, produced significant contributions since the 1970s to the development of human rights legislation and policies benefiting children and adults with disabilities. Through her work in the World Bank and the State Department, Heumann led the mainstreaming of disability rights into international development. Her contributions extended the international reach of the independent living movement.

Early life and education 
Heumann was born in Philadelphia, to Werner and Ilse Heumann, who were German Jewish immigrants. Heumann was the oldest of three children and she grew up in Brooklyn, New York. Her mother came to the US from Germany in 1935 while her father came in 1934. Heumann's grandparents, great-grandparents, and many other family members were killed in the Holocaust. Her brother Joseph Heumann is a film professor and author.

Heumann contracted polio at the age of 18 months, and used a wheelchair most of her life. She rejected cliches about disability as a tragic experience, saying, "Disability only becomes a tragedy for me when society fails to provide the things we need to lead our lives––job opportunities or barrier-free buildings, for example. It is not a tragedy to me that I'm living in a wheelchair."

Heumann and her parents had to fight repeatedly for her to be included in the educational system. The local public school refused to allow her to attend, calling her a fire hazard due to her inability to walk. Instead, for three years she was given home instruction twice a week, for about an hour each visit. Heumann's mother, Ilsa Heumann, a community activist in her own right, challenged the decision. Heumann was then allowed to go to a special school in the fourth grade for disabled children. Per city policy, Heumann was to return to home instruction for high school. Heumann's mother rallied against this policy with other parents who put enough pressure on the school to reverse the policy. Heumann entered high school in 1961.

She attended Camp Jened, a camp for children with disabilities, in Hunter, New York, every summer from ages 9 to 18. Heumann's experience of camp brought her a greater awareness of the shared disabled experience, later saying, "We had the same joy together, the same anger over the way we were treated and the same frustrations at opportunities we didn't have." At Camp Jened, Heumann met Bobbi Linn and Freida Tankus, both of whom she would later work with as disability rights activists. The 2020 Oscar-nominated documentary Crip Camp features Camp Jened campers, including Heumann.

Heumann graduated from Long Island University in 1969. She also earned a Master of Science degree in public health at the University of California, Berkeley in 1975.

Heumann began making major moves toward rights for people with disabilities while attending Long Island University. She organized rallies and protests with other students with and without disabilities, demanding access to her classrooms by ramps and the right to live in a dorm. Heumann studied speech therapy.

Heumann v. Board of Education of the City of New York 
In 1970, Heumann was denied her New York teaching license because the Board did not believe she could get herself or her students out of the building in case of a fire. She sued the Board of Education on the basis of discrimination. A local newspaper ran a headline of "You Can Be President, Not Teacher, with Polio". The case settled without a trial and Heumann became the first wheelchair user to teach in New York City and taught elementary school there for three years.

Policy work and advocacy

Disabled in Action 

Heumann received much mail from disabled people around the country due to her press coverage while suing the Board of Education. Many wrote in about their experiences with discrimination because of their disabilities. Based on the outpouring of support and letters, in 1970, Heumann and several friends founded Disabled in Action (DIA), an organization that focused on securing the protection of people with disabilities under civil rights laws through political protest. It was originally called Handicapped in Action, but Heumann disliked that name and lobbied to change it. Early versions of the Rehabilitation Act of 1973 were vetoed by President Richard Nixon in October 1972 and March 1973. In 1972, DIA demonstrated in New York City with a sit-in protesting one of the vetoes. Led by Heumann, eighty activists staged this sit-in on Madison Avenue, stopping traffic.

Center for Independent Living 

Ed Roberts asked Heumann to move to California to work for the Center for Independent Living where she served as the deputy director from 1975 to 1982. She was an early proponent of the Independent Living Movement. Heumann was responsible for the implementation of legislation at the national level for programs in special education, disability research, vocational rehabilitation and independent living, serving more than 8 million youth and adults with disabilities.

Individuals with Disabilities Education Act 

While serving as a legislative assistant to the chairperson of the U.S. Senate Committee on Labor and Public Welfare in 1974, Heumann helped develop legislation that became the Individuals with Disabilities Education Act.

504 Sit-in 

In 1977, Joseph Califano, U.S. Secretary of Health, Education and Welfare, refused to sign meaningful regulations for Section 504 of the Rehabilitation Act of 1973, which was the first U.S. federal civil rights protection for people with disabilities. Califano issued orders that no meals or medication would be allowed in the HEW federal building, to force protesters out. The protesters then contacted Delancey Street Foundation and The Salvation Army, which agreed to bring them food for the following day. Fellow protester Kitty Cone developed a way to keep medication cool by taping a box over the air conditioner unit to store the medication of the disabled protesters. Additionally, the protesters received support from the Black Panther Party after receiving a call from Brad Lomax a disabled protester with multiple sclerosis and member of the Black Panther Party. Lomax called the Black Panthers to support the protesters with meals, and the Black Panthers brought them hot meals and snacks for the duration of the Sit-in. After an ultimatum and deadline, demonstrations took place in ten U.S. cities on April 5, 1977, including the beginning of the 504 Sit-in at the San Francisco office of the U.S. Department of Health, Education and Welfare. This sit-in, led by Heumann and organized by Kitty Cone, lasted until May 4, 1977, a total of 28 days, with about 125 to 150 people refusing to leave. It is the longest sit-in at a federal building, . Joseph Califano signed both Education of All Handicapped Children and Section 504 on April 28, 1977.

World Institute on Disability 

Heumann co-founded the World Institute on Disability with Ed Roberts and Joan Leon in 1983, serving as co-director until 1993.

Department on Disability Services 

Washington, D.C. mayor Adrian Fenty appointed Heumann as the city's first Director for the Department on Disability Services, where she was responsible for the Developmental Disability Administration and the Rehabilitation Services Administration.

Clinton Administration 

Heumann served in the Clinton Administration as Assistant Secretary of the Office of Special Education and Rehabilitation Services at the United States Department of Education from 1993 to 2001.

World Bank 

From 2002 to 2006, Heumann served as the World Bank Group's first Advisor on Disability and Development, leading the World Bank's work on disability and worked to expand the Bank's knowledge and capability to work with governments and civil society on including disability in the Bank discussions with client countries, its country-based analytical work, and support for improving policies, programs, and projects that allow disabled people around the world to live and work in the economic and social mainstream of their communities. She was Lead Consultant to the Global Partnership for Disability and Development.

Special Advisor 

In 2010, Heumann became the Special Advisor on International Disability Rights for the U.S. State Department appointed by President Barack Obama. Heumann was the first to hold this role, and served from 2010 to 2017. During her tenure, she tried unsuccessfully to persuade the Senate to ratify the United Nations Convention on the Rights of Persons with Disabilities, an international treaty modeled on the Americans with Disabilities Act.

On January 20, 2017, Heumann left her post at the State Department with the change of a new administration. The Special Advisor role was disestablished by United States Secretary of State Rex Tillerson in 2017. It was later reestablished under the Biden administration.

Ford Foundation 

From September 2017 to April 2019, Heumann was a Senior Fellow at the Ford Foundation. At Ford, she worked to help advance the inclusion of disability in the Foundation's work. She also promoted the intentional inclusion of disability in philanthropy work. Heumann produced a paper co-written by Katherine Salinas and Michellie Hess titled Roadmap for Inclusion: Changing the Face of Disability in Media. This paper explores the lack of representation of disabled people in front of and behind the camera, as well as prominent stereotypes of disabled characters when represented in the media, and concludes with a call to action to increase disabled representation in media.

Author 
Heumann's book, Being Heumann: An Unrepentant Memoir of a Disability Rights Activist, was published in February 2020.

Podcast 
In March 2021, Heumann began producing a bi-weekly podcast The Heumann Perspective where she spoke with disabled changemakers and their allies. The podcast featured opening music by artist Lachi, and featured guests such as filmmaker James LeBrecht, activists Lydia X. Z. Brown and Leroy F. Moore Jr., model Jillian Mercado, creator Spencer West and many others.

Personal life and death 
Heumann married Jorge Pineda in 1992. They lived in Washington, D.C. She died there on March 4, 2023, at age 75.

Media 
 The 2008 documentary The Power of 504 prominently features Heumann
 Heumann appears in the 2011 documentary Lives Worth Living.
 Heumann delivered a TEDTalk in 2017.
 Comedy Central made a 2018 episode of Drunk History on the 504 Sit-in, with Heumann played by Ali Stroker
 Heumann appeared on Bloomberg on July 6, 2019, to discuss representation of disability in the media
 Heumann was interviewed by Trevor Noah on The Daily Show in 2020
 Heumann is featured in the 2020 documentary Crip Camp
Heumann was interviewed by the Urban Institute
Heumann was interviewed by the Center for Jewish History

Awards and recognition 
 2022: Women's Entrepreneurship Day Organization's Humanitarian Pioneer Award. Received at the United Nations, celebrating her as a trailblazer and innovator in her field. The prestigious award, also recognized by the US Congress, highlights women entrepreneurs and the meaningful impact they are having on the world.
 2022: Named one of the BBC 100 Women
 2020: Named Time Magazine’s 1977 Woman of the Year, in a retrospective in 2020 
 2020: Henry Viscardi Achievement Awards
 2020: Critics' Choice Documentary Award honor as one of the "Most Compelling Living Subjects of a Documentary", regarding the documentary Crip Camp
 2019: The Lurie Institute for Disability Policy gave an award "The journey to Achieving Equality: Past, Present, and Future of Disability Activism with gratitude for your leadership and activism in civil rights."
2018: Women's Caucus Award given by the National Council on Independent Living
 2018: Society for Disability Studies President's Award. SDS says of their decision to award Heumann:
 2017: U.S. International Council on Disabilities, Dole-Harkin Award
 2017: InterAction Disability Inclusion Award, in recognition of Heumann's major impact on disability inclusion in international development.
 2014: The Berkeley Rotary Club gave its annual Rotary Peace Grove Award to Heumann and the late Ed Roberts, another disability rights activist.
 Max Starkloff Lifetime Achievement Award from National Council on Independent Living In recognition of a lifetime of dedicated hard work and leadership to advance the Independent Living and Disability Rights Movements and her commitment to the protection and expansion of the civil and human rights of people with disabilities.
 Champion of Disability Rights Award from the SPAN Parent Advocacy Network. "For lifelong commitment and activism for the human and civil rights of children and adults with disabilities in the United States throughout the world."
 Advocacy Award from ALPHA Disability Section: "This award is presented to a person or a consumer-driven organization who has demonstrated excellence in the area of advocacy to improve the health and quality of life for people with disabilities."
 Heumann was the first recipient of the Henry B. Betts Award from the Rehabilitation Institute of Chicago (later awarded jointly with the American Association of People with Disabilities).
Heumann was awarded seven honorary doctorates, including doctorates from Brooklyn College and New York University.

References

Further reading 
 Judith E. Heumann,  "Including the Voices of Disabled People in the International Development Agenda", Thornburgh Family Lecture Series, University of Pittsburgh School of Law accessed July 24, 2006
 Judith E. Heumann, Disability Rights and Independent Living Movement: Pioneering Disability Rights Advocate and Leader, 1960s–2000, oral history, Online Archive of California, 2004, retrieved from Pioneering Disability Rights Advocate and Leader in Disabled in Action, New York; Center for Independent Living, Berkeley; World Institute on Disability; and the US Department of Education, 1960s–2000 July 24, 2006
 Ilene Zeitzer interview with Heumann. Originally published in "Change from Within: International Overview of the Impact of Disabled Politicians and Disability Policy Bodies on Governance". Retrieved from Rolling Rains Report:: Interview: Judy Heumann, World Bank Advisor on Disability & Development, April 29, 2009

External links 
 Judy Heumann's Official Website
 Disability Social History Project Bio details
 Bio details on World Institute on Disability website
 ]

|-

1947 births
2023 deaths
20th-century American Jews
21st-century American Jews
Activists from Washington, D.C.
American disability rights activists
American people of German-Jewish descent
American people with disabilities
BBC 100 Women
Clinton administration personnel
Long Island University alumni
Obama administration personnel
UC Berkeley School of Public Health alumni
United States Department of Education officials
United States Special Envoys
Wheelchair users